Scremerston railway station served the village of Scremerston, Northumberland, England from 1847 to 1951 on the East Coast Main Line.

History 
The station opened on 29 March 1847 by the York, Newcastle and Berwick Railway. The station was situated at a level crossing of an unnamed minor road a mile east from Scremerston village. This was one of the original Newcastle and Berwick stations and it was designed by the Newcastle architect Benjamin Green. South of the level crossing was a siding that served a lime depot. The passenger traffic at most of the main line stations in the north of Northumberland was so light that the LNER closed most of them; Scremerston was one of them, closing on 5 May 1941. The station later reopened on 7 October 1946, although Sunday services were stopped. In 1950, a memorandum was made that showed that closure would yield an annual net economy of £559 so it was recommended that the station should close to all traffic. The station closed to passengers again on 8 July 1951 and closed completely the day after, although an unadvertised service ran in 1953. The platforms were demolished in 1959. The lime depot still exists and the station house is in residential use.

References

External links 

Disused railway stations in Northumberland
Former North Eastern Railway (UK) stations
Railway stations in Great Britain opened in 1847
Railway stations in Great Britain closed in 1941
Railway stations in Great Britain opened in 1946
Railway stations in Great Britain closed in 1951
1847 establishments in England
1951 disestablishments in England